Hadassa Bimko Rosensaft (August 26, 1912 – October 3, 1997) was a Polish holocaust survivor. She is credited with saving thousands of Holocaust victims.

Biography
Rosensaft was born on August 26, 1912, in Sosnowiec, Poland. She studied dentistry at the University of Nancy, in France. Rosensaft graduated in 1935, with a degree in dental surgery. She soon returned to Sosnowiec, where she found employment as a dentist. On August 2, 1943, Rosensaft was deported to Auschwitz concentration camp. While at the camp, she worked as a doctor under Josef Mengele. In her doctoring, Rosensaft saved many lives by smuggling medical materials to them, and doctoring and disguising their wounds.

On November 14, 1944, Rosensaft was placed in charge of what would grow to be over 150 children at Bergen-Belsen concentration camp. She cared for them until the camp was liberated by British forces on April 15, 1945. Two days later, H. L. Glyn Hughes placed Rosensaft in charge of caring for all of the camps wounded. After the war was over, in 1945, Rosensaft became a member of the Central Committee of Liberated Jews, and would later be elected vice-chair. During the Nuremberg trials, she served as a key witness. Rosensaft would help identify 15 of the defendants including Josef Kramer.

Rosensaft married Josef Rosensaft on August 18, 1946, and (after eight years in Montreux), the couple moved to New York. She served as honorary president of the World Federation of Bergen-Belsen Associations, and would later be named to both the Presidents Commission on the Holocaust in 1978. Rosensaft was named to the council of the United States Holocaust Memorial Museum in 1980 by Jimmy Carter. She was also made a chair to the Archives and Library Committee of the United States Holocaust Memorial Museum. Rosensaft died of liver failure on October 3, 1997, at Tisch Hospital in New York City.

References

1912 births
1997 deaths
Holocaust survivors
Jewish concentration camp survivors
Bergen-Belsen concentration camp survivors
Auschwitz concentration camp survivors
Deaths from liver failure